FC Desna Chernihiv is a Ukrainian football club based in Chernihiv. The original name of the club was "Avanhard" (FC Avanhard Chernihiv) during its first year of existence as part of a republican Avanhard sports society. Between 1961 and 1970 the club was called Desna. In 1972 it was replaced with SC Chernihiv (team of the SKA Kyiv) that played in Chernihiv for the next couple of years. In 1977 Desna was revived now in place of the amateur club "Khimik Chernihiv" that won regional competitions.

Players in national teams
 In September 2021, Vladyslav Kalitvintsev become the first player belong Desna to be called in the  Ukraine national football team against Finland. For the same match has been included also Serhiy Bolbat who played in Desna on loan from Shakhtar Donetsk. There are other players who took part in the national team before and after playing in the club like Pylyp Budkivskyi, Yevhen Selin, Andriy Totovytskyi, Denys Bezborodko and Vladislav Nosenko. The first player to be called Ukraine national football team was Yukhym Konoplya in 2020 but the player was on loan to the club by Shakhtar Donetsk There are other players who took part in the national team before and after playing in the club like Pylyp Budkivskyi, Yevhen Selin, Andriy Totovytskyi, Denys Bezborodko. Regarding other country, Desna had the Estonian international experience Joonas Tamm and the Constantin Dima who served only the under 21 team. The club had also Andriy Biba that he played one match for Soviet Union national football team, Oleh Kuznetsov, thatafter left the club got into the final of the European Football Championship in 1988 and Viktor Bannikov that he also got into the final of the European Football Championship in 1972.

Ukraine

The lists of players who took part in the national team during their time at the club. In bold the player corrently playing for the club.

Estonia

The lists of players who took part in the national team during their time at the club.

Romania

The lists of players who took part in the national team during their time at the club.

Player records and statistics

Appearances
Most player appearances in all competitions:  Serhiy Sapronov, 474 matches
Most foreign player appearances in all competitions:  Kakhaberi Sartania, 136 matches

Goalkeepers
 Most clean sheets in Ukrainian Premier League:  Yevhen Past, 11 matches in the season 2019–20 (with Andriy Pyatov)
 Most appearances in all competitions:  Yuriy Ovcharov, 198 matches
 Most appearances in UEFA Europa League:  Yevhen Past, 1 match
 Most appearances as foreigner goalkeeper:  Nikoloz Kheladze, 2 matches
 Most appearances goalkeeper with dual citizenship: Dmytro Tyapushkin, 116 matches

Goalscorers 
Most goals in all competitions:  Oleksandr Kozhemyachenko, 128 goals
Most goals by season in Ukrainian Premier League:  Oleksandr Filippov Season 2019–20 (16 goals)

Top goalscorers 
 Top Scorer Ukrainian Second League:  Oleksandr Kozhemyachenko season  2010–11 (12 goals)
 Top Scorer Ukrainian Second League:  Oleksandr Kozhemyachenko season 2004–05 (20 goals)
 Top Scorer Ukrainian Second League:  Oleksandr Kozhemyachenko season 2005–06 (21 goals)

Most Valuable Players

Full appearances
This List of Desna Chernihiv records and statistics. In bold the players who are corrently playing with Desna.

Managerial records
 Longest-serving manager: Oleksandr Ryabokon (9 years)

Presidential records
 Longest-serving President: Ivan Chaus - September 1999 — August 2007 (8 Years)

Foreign players
The List of Foreign Players of Desna Chernihiv.

Foreigners

Dual citizenship

Other

Captains
List of Captains of Desna Chernihiv since 1960
 

In bold the player that are still playing for the club

Honours and distinctions

Domestic competitions
Ukrainian First League
  Runners-up (1): 2016–17

Ukrainian Second League
  Winners (3): 1996–97 (Group A), 2005–06 (Group A), 2012–13 (Group A) (record)
  Runners-up (4): 2000–01 (Group C), 2003–04 (Group C), 2004–05 (Group C), 2011–12 (Group A)

Cup of the Ukrainian SSR
  Semifinal (1) 1990

Championship of the Ukrainian SSR
    Runners-up (2): 1982, 1966
    Runners-up (1): 1968

Ukrainian Amateur Football Championship	
   Winners (1): 1976 as Khimik Chernihiv

Ukrainian First League
  Winners (1) Fair Play award 2017–18 season

Ukrainian Premier League
  Winners (1) Fair Play award 2019–20 season

Individual player and coach awards
Ukrainian Footballer of the Year
 Denys Favorov 2020 (Desna, Zorya)

Best Coach of Ukrainian First League
 Oleksandr Ryabokon 2016–17

Best Player of Ukrainian First League
 Denys Favorov 2017–18

Top scorer of Ukrainian Second League
 Oleksandr Kozhemyachenko: 2010–11 (12 goals)
 Oleksandr Kozhemyachenko: 2004–05 (20 goals)
 Oleksandr Kozhemyachenko: 2005–06 (21 goals)

Top Scorer Ukrainian Premier League Reserves (Under 21)
 Illya Shevtsov 2019–20

European record 
Desna qualified for European football for the first time in the 2020–21 season, where they made their debut in the Europa League.

UEFA club rankings

As of 23 April 2022.

References

records and statistics
Ukrainian football club statistics
Association football club records and statistics